Martyringa is a genus of moths of the family Lecithoceridae.

Species
Martyringa hoenei Lvovsky, 2010
Martyringa latipennis (Walsingham, 1882)
Martyringa ussuriella Lvovsky, 1979
Martyringa xeraula (Meyrick, 1910)

References

 
Lecithoceridae